"Going to California" is a 1971 song by Led Zeppelin.

Going to California may also refer to:

Going to California (TV series), an American television series
Going to California (That '70s Show), an episode of the television series That '70s Show
Going to California (Tears for Fears video), a 1990 concert performance video by the group Tears for Fears